|}

The Mill Reef Stakes is a Group 2 flat horse race in Great Britain open to two-year-olds. It is run at Newbury over a distance of 6 furlongs (1,207 metres), and it is scheduled to take place each year in September.

History
The event is named after Mill Reef, a highly successful racehorse in the early 1970s. He was trained at Kingsclere, located several miles from Newbury.

The Mill Reef Stakes replaced a similar race, the Crookham Stakes, in 1972. The winner of the inaugural running, Mon Fils, went on to win the following year's 2,000 Guineas.

The leading horses from the Mill Reef Stakes sometimes race next in the Middle Park Stakes or the Dewhurst Stakes.

Records
Leading jockey (5 wins):
 Pat Eddery – Habat (1973), Red Cross (1974), Formidable (1977), Lord Seymour (1979), Magic of Life (1987)

Leading trainer (4 wins):
 Richard Hannon Sr. – Mon Fils (1972), Showbrook (1991), Galeota (2004), Cool Creek (2005)
 Peter Walwyn – Habat (1973), Red Cross (1974), Formidable (1977), Luqman (1985)

Winners

Crookham Stakes
The Crookham Stakes, named after the village of Crookham, was the precursor of the Mill Reef Stakes (although run over a distance of 7 furlongs and 60 yards (1,463 metres)).

 1960: Colour Blind
 1961: All a Gogg
 1962: My Myosotis
 1963: Soderini
 1964: Audience
 1965: Fontex
 1966: Karpathos
 1967: Hurry Hurry
 1968: Full Dress
 1969: Hazy Idea
 1970: Revellarie
 1971: Alonso

See also
 Horse racing in Great Britain
 List of British flat horse races

References
 Paris-Turf: 
 Racing Post:
 galopp-sieger.de – Mill Reef Stakes (ex Crookham Stakes).
 horseracingintfed.com – International Federation of Horseracing Authorities – Mill Reef Stakes (2018).
 pedigreequery.com – Mill Reef Stakes – Newbury.
 

Flat races in Great Britain
Newbury Racecourse
Flat horse races for two-year-olds
Recurring sporting events established in 1972
1972 establishments in England